WNYW (Radio New York Worldwide) was a shortwave radio station that broadcast from Scituate, Massachusetts, in the United States. During WWII the station became important for the British and the Norwegian information services. On October 20, 1973, Family Stations, Inc., acquired the station to be part of its Family Radio network and changed the call letters to WYFR. Family Stations eventually progressively moved the transmitters to their current site in Okeechobee, Florida. The transmitter site in Scituate continued to operate until November 16, 1979 when it was switched off for the last time.

History

On October 15, 1927, Walter Lemmon, a radio inventor, was granted the first shortwave radio license in the United States and began experimental shortwave station W1XAL in Boston, Massachusetts. In 1935, the station began transmitting non-commercial, educational, and cultural programs. Supported by charitable institutions it was a not run for profit.

Four days after Britain and France declared war on Germany, on September 7, 1939, the Federal Communications Commission (FCC) assigned call letters WRUL (for "World Radio University Listeners") to the station. As it had a large worldwide listening audience, which regularly corresponded with the station and a high power transmitter it was seen by British Security Co-ordination (BSC), a covert organization that the British Secret Intelligence Service established in New York City as a vehicle for conducting political warfare on behalf of the British. The station was transmitting mostly in English so BSC provided through third parties the finance, translators, and foreign language announcers to produce high-quality programming in other languages. BSC also provided the material to be broadcast and so by 1941 WRUL had become unknowingly an arm of the BSC though outwardly independent and believing itself to be so. From 1939 to 1942, WRUL broadcast radio lectures to Europe and South America in eight languages, and also in the United States over an informal network of over 300 stations, including WNYC in New York City. Following the  establishment of what would become the OSS, American propaganda was provided to the station, but it was not until the entry of the US into the war that BSC handed over control. Like all United States shortwave stations, in November 1942 the U.S. government leased WRUL for further wartime propaganda broadcasts. WRUL was allowed to resume partial independent programming in 1947, and full independent programming in 1954.

From September 1940 and throughout WWII the Norwegian government had a daily half hour transmission in Norwegian for the sailors in the Norwegian commercial fleet. One broadcaster was the photojournalist Kari Berggrav.

Metromedia bought the station in 1960. In June 1962, International Educational Broadcasting Corporation (now Bonneville International), owned by the Church of Jesus Christ of Latter-day Saints, bought WRUL. The station adopted the slogan "Radio New York Worldwide"  and used studios in New York City and an adult contemporary format, with ABC Radio or CBS Radio hourly and half-hour newscasts and from its sister station, WRFM. On-air staff from WRFM would also have separate shifts on WRUL. There were rumors that the station was being partially controlled by the Central Intelligence Agency to broadcast anti-communist propaganda.

On June 1, 1966, WRUL changed its call letters to WNYW, which stood for "Radio New York Worldwide". The station attempted to do some commercial programming, but there were few advertisers because it was difficult to estimate audience ratings for the wide geographical area that shortwave stations typically covered.

In 1970, Bonneville offered to sell the station to the U.S. government for a token payment of one dollar, for use by the Voice of America, but no sale materialized.

In 1974, Bonneville sold WNYW. The callsign would eventually be adopted by the Fox Broadcasting Company's flagship station, WNYW (formerly Metromedia station WNEW-TV and DuMont Television Network station WABD) in New York City, in 1986.

References

External links
A history of WNYW by Lou Josephs
A presentation of WNYW by Lou Josephs
DXing Worldwide on WNYW

Shortwave radio stations in the United States
Defunct radio stations in the United States
Radio stations established in 1931
Radio stations disestablished in 1979
NYW